VirtualDJ (VDJ) is audio and video mixing software for Microsoft Windows and macOS, developed by Atomix Productions.

History 
The first version of VirtualDJ appeared on 1 July 2003. VirtualDJ is the successor to AtomixMP3, the first version of which dates from September 2000. The development of AtomixMP3 stopped in December 2003 as soon as its successor VirtualDJ was marketed. VirtualDJ existed in three different versions until 2009:  Home Edition  (sold in stores),  PRO  (only available online), and  Limited Version  (free with certain MIDI controllers). In late 2009, a new version called  VirtualDJ Basic  went on sale as a budget-friendly alternative to VirtualDJ Pro, without MIDI control. Since May 2014, (the release of version 8 ) 5 licence options are available:  Pro Infinity  (the full version, one time purchase, free updates),  Pro Subscription  (same access as Pro Infinity but a monthly subscription charge),  Business  (same access as Pro Infinity with addition support severices), Home Plus  (Hardware control limited to a single device type),  Home User '' (No hardware control other than a 10 minute trial when you start the software) .

In 2010, VirtualDJ won the prize for best mixing software at the 25th edition of the Annual International Dance Music Awards in Miami.

Features 
The software has a default layout made of two turntables (vinyl or CD) associated with a central mixer. It includes a bar for viewing the status of the two audio tracks as well as the management of the playlist and of current readings with a search function in the database.    The current track of the different decks appears in a graphical window at the top of the screen which visualizes the curve (waveform) of the live sound. The user can also perform loops of variable duration.
As a professional DJ software, VirtualDJ allows users to plug in their DJ controllers. It also works with custom DJ systems built by users and it recognizes any different hardware turntable or mixer. 

VDJ has a scripting language, vdjscript, that allows mapping actions to hardware controls or the computer keyboard.

SoundCloud Go+ subscribers can integrate SoundCloud with VirtualDJ to allow streaming and mixing of the entire SoundCloud catalogue.

References

External links 
 

Audio mixing software
DJ software
MacOS multimedia software
Windows multimedia software
Freeware